Kinnock is a surname of Scottish origin.

Notable people
Neil Kinnock (born 1942), Welsh politician
Glenys Kinnock (born 1944), English politician, wife of Neil
Stephen Kinnock (born 1970), Welsh politician, son of Neil and Glenys

See also
Pinnock

References